Billingford may refer to:

 Billingford, Breckland, a village and civil parish near Dereham, in Norfolk, England
 Billingford, South Norfolk, a village in the parish of Scole, near Diss, in Norfolk, England
 Billingford Windmill
 Richard de Billingford, chancellor of Cambridge University